The Ambassador of Sweden to Finland is Sweden's foremost diplomatic representative in the Republic of Finland, and in charge of Sweden's diplomatic mission in Finland.

Heads of Mission

See also
 Finland-Sweden relations
 Embassy of Sweden, Helsinki
 Embassy of Finland, Stockholm

References

External links
 Official website of the Embassy of Sweden to Finland

Ambassadors of Sweden to Finland
Finland
Sweden